Spodoptera cosmioides is an armyworm moth of the family Noctuidae found in Central America and South America (from Panama and Trinidad south to Argentina).

Taxonomy
Walker (1858) originally described cosmioides, placing it in the genus Prodenia.

Basionym: Prodenia cosmioides Walker, 1858.

Pogue (2002) revived S. cosmioides (Walker, 1858), as a valid species (though misspelled as S. cosmiodes), from synonymy with S. latifascia (Walker, 1856).

Description

Ecology
No host plants are listed for S. cosmioides on the HOSTS database of the Natural History Museum, London. However, S. cosmioides and closely related congeners feed on many herbaceous plants and are regarded as pests thereof (e.g. da Silva et al., 2017).

Geography
Type Locality: Pará, Brazil.

Pogue (2002) saw voucher material from the following countries: Argentina, Bolivia, Brazil, Colombia, Costa Rica, Ecuador, French Guiana, Guyana, Panama, Paraguay, Peru, Trinidad, Venezuela.

Similar species
Spodoptera latifascia (Walker, 1856)
Spodoptera descoinsi Lalanne-Cassou & Silvain, 1994

(see Pogue, 2002) for differences

References

External links

cosmioides
Moths of Central America
Moths of South America
Lepidoptera of Brazil
Moths described in 1858